The 2010–11 Belgian Elite League pitted eight Belgian rugby teams. It starts on 12 September 2010 and ending with a final game on 7 May 2011 in the King Baudouin Stadium. The Royal Kituro Rugby Club won the competition by defeating the defending champion, Boitsfort Rugby Club, with a score of 13-8.

Season table

{| class="wikitable" width="450px" style="float:left; font-size:95%; margin-left:15px;"
| colspan="2"  style="text-align:center; background:#fff;" cellpadding="0" cellspacing="0"|Key to colours
|-
| style="background: #3fff00;" |     
| Champions
|-
| style="background:#ccf;"|     
|Participants in Championship Playoffs
|-
| style="background: #ff79B4;" |     
|Bottom team is relegated to Division 2.
|}

Championship playoffs

External links

2010–11
2010–11  in European rugby union leagues